This is a list of people from Brampton, Ontario, Canada.

Note that this list largely does not include players from the Brampton Beast ECHL hockey team. Also note included are people who were post-secondary students who didn't live locally before or after, namely Kent Monkman and Patrick McKenna.

A

 Lee Aaron (b. 1962 as Karen Lynn Greening), rock and jazz singer, raised in Brampton
 Sam Acheampong (b. 1996), CFL football player
 Stephen Adekolu (b. 1989), CFL football player, BC Lions
 Oluniké Adeliyi (b. 1977), actress
 AHI (b. Ahkinoah Habah Izarh), folk music singer-songwriter
 James Albert Manning Aikins (1851-1929), lawyer, politician, and lieutenant governor of Manitoba
 Ayo Akinola (b. 2000), soccer player
 Ohenewa Akuffo (b. 1979), entrepreneur (fitness studio), retired wrestler
 Keven Alemán (b. 1994), soccer player
 Charles Allen (b. 1977), track and field athlete
 Clyde Alves, dancer, actor and singer
 Stella Ambler (b. 1966), former MP, Mississauga South (2011-2015)
 Troy Amos-Ross (b. 1975), entrepreneur (daycare), retired boxer
 Trey Anthony (b. 1974), playwright of da Kink in My Hair
 Caroline Helena Armington (1875-1939), etcher
 Thomas W. Armstrong (1858-1927), Wisconsin State Assembly
 Lise Arsenault (c. 1954), gymnast, team gymnastics at the 1976 Summer Olympics
 Olu Ashaolu (b. 1988), basketball
 Aaron Ashmore (b. 1979), actor, Smallville
 Shawn Ashmore (b. 1979), actor, X-Men movie series, Terry Fox in Terry
 Sarkis Assadourian (b. 1948), politician, first Armenian-Canadian to be elected to the House of Commons
 Sid C. Attard (b. 1950), horse racing

B

 Michael Bailey (b. 1982), CFL football player
 Scott Bailey (b. 1970), curler
 Navdeep Bains (b. 1977), politician, MP and former Minister of Innovation, Science and Economic Development
 Rupan Bal (b. 1990, Rupanjit Bal), actor and comedian
 Daundre Barnaby (b. 1990), track and field
 Donald N. Bastian, retired Bishop of The Free Methodist Church of North America
 Andy Bathgate (b. 1932), ice hockey player
 Colleen Beaumier (b. 1944), politician
 Larry Beauregard (1956-1985), flautist
 Charles Bediako (b. 2002), college basketball player
 Hayleigh Bell (b. 1996), pairs skater
 Anthony Bennett (b. 1993), basketball player, forward for the Cleveland Cavaliers, drafted first overall in the 2013 NBA Draft
 Matthew Bennett (b. 1993), NLL lacrosse player
 Sim Bhullar (b. 1992), basketball
 Catherine Black, actress
 Justine Blainey (b. 1973), fought in court for the right for females to participate in male sports
 Jahvon Blair (b. 1998), college basketball player
 Ronald Bloore (1925–2009), Member of the Order of Canada; organizer and member of the "Regina Five" (1960)
 Luciano Borsato (b. 1966), hockey player
 Mark Boswell (b. 1977), Olympic high-jumper
 Bernadette Bowyer (b. 1966), field hockey
 Robert William Bradford (b. 1923), C.M., former Director of the National Aviation Museum
 Nathaniel Branden (1930-2014), psychotherapist, best known as a former associate of Ayn Rand and founder of the Nathaniel Branden Institute
 Ransford Brempong (b. 1981), basketball player
 Bonnie Briggs (c. 1952 to 1953-2017), affordable housing advocate, poet
 Patrick Brown (b. 1978), former leader of the Progressive Conservative Party of Ontario, former MPP for Simcoe North, current Mayor of Brampton
 Ross Brownridge (b. 1957), retired EHL, AHL ice hockey player
 Claire Buchanan (b. 1987), member of Team Canada at the IPC's first women's sledge hockey tournament
 Tajon Buchanan (b. 1999), soccer player forward
 Krista Buecking (b. 1982), Los Angeles-based visual artist
 Stan Butler (b. 1956), OHL ice hockey coach

C

 Shawna Cain, Christian R&B singer
 Bryan Cameron (b. 1989), ECHL hockey player
 Alexander Franklin Campbell, Mayor of Brampton
 Cassie Campbell (b. 1973), broadcaster, retired hockey player (CWHL and Olympics)
 Lauren Campbell (b. 1981), triathlete
 Ryan Campbell, CLL lacrosse player
 Shane Campbell (b. 1987), Muay Thai kickboxer and MMA fighter
 Alessia Cara (b. 1996), singer and songwriter
 Denise Carriere (b. 1970), softball player
 David Carruthers, curler
 Anne Laurel Carter (b. 1953), author
 Don Cash (b. 1978), rap artist, record producer
 Andrew Cassels (b. 1969), retired hockey player
 Michael Cera (b. 1988), comedic actor, born and raised in Brampton; a regular on the television series Arrested Development; starred in the movies Superbad, Juno, and Scott Pilgrim vs. the World, in which Brampton is mentioned as an in-joke
 Ena Chadha (b. 1967), human rights lawyer
 Keshia Chanté (b. 1988), singer, Juno Award winner
 Jay Chapman (b. 1994), MLS soccer player
 Samuel Charters (1863-1943), newspaper publisher, Mayor of Brampton, MPP, MP
 Kenneth Chisholm (1829–1906), businessman, MPP, Reeve of Brampton
 Lara Jean Chorostecki (b. 1984), actress, Hannibal
 Samuel Clarke (1853-1928), MPP, Northumberland West (1887-1890), mayor of Cobourg
 Stephen Clarke (b. 1973), Olympic swimmer
 Tony Clement (b. 1961), former MP, former MPP, former President of the Treasury Board
 Andrew Coe (b. 1996), rugby union player
 Jason Collett, singer-songwriter, member of Broken Social Scene
 Shay Colley (b. 1996), basketball, NCAA Division I and Team Canada
 Ashley Comeau (b. 1984), actress, comedian
 Darren Copeland (b. 1968), electroacoustic music composer
 Peter Corner (b. 1968), curler, skip
 Paulo Costanzo (b. 1978), actor, Joey, Royal Pains
 John Coyne (1836-1873), MPP for Peel
 Dave Cranmer (b. 1944), CFL player, taught at Bramalea Secondary School
 Herbert Crawford (1878-1946), Alberta politician
 Sam Cureatz (b. 1948), MPP, Durham East (1987-1990)
 Philip J. Currie (b. 1949), palaeontologist and museum curator who helped found the Royal Tyrrell Museum of Palaeontology
 Chris Cuthbert (b. 1957), sports play-by-play announcer

D

 Peter DaCunha (b. 2003), child actor
 Kaylee Dakers (b. 1991), swimmer
 Denton Daley (b. 1982), cruiserweight boxer
 George Dance, political candidate, leader of the Libertarian Party of Canada (1991–1993)
 Mike Danton (b. 1980), former MHL hockey player, now international, jailed for conspiracy to commit murder
 Tracy Dawson, actor
 William G. Davis (b. 1929), Premier of Ontario
 Bob Dechert (b. 1958), former MP for Mississauga—Erindale
 Vincent DeGiorgio, lyricist, former record executive
 Patrick Denipitiya (1934-2013), Sri Lankan musician
 Dayna Deruelle (b. 1982), curler
 Mark DeSantis (b. 1972), coach for Brampton Beast
 Aminder Dhaliwal (b. 1988), cartoonist and animator
 Ruby Dhalla (b. 1974), Liberal MP for Brampton—Springdale
 Vic Dhillon (b. c. 1969), politician, MPP for Brampton West
 Kirk Diamond, dancehall and reggae musician
 Director X (b. 1975, Julien Christian Lutz), music video director
 Danilo Djuricic (b. 1999), basketball player
 Andy Donato (b. 1937), editorial cartoonist, Toronto Sun
 Naheed Dosani, palliative care physician
 Steve Duplantis (1972–2008), professional golf caddy
 Mike Dwyer (ice hockey) (b. 1957), NHL, WHA hockey player

E

 Chuck Ealey (b. 1950), former CFL player, once the winningest college football quarterback
 Joseph Earngey (1870-1939), Mayor of Kenora (1915-1918), MPP for Kenora (1926-1929), newspaper publisher
 Mike Edem (b. 1989), CFL player
 Kenny Ejim (1994-2022), CEBL basketball player
 Melvin Ejim (b. 1991), ABA basketball player
 Faith Ekakitie (b. 1993), former CFL player
 Todd Elik (b. 1966), NHL, international hockey player
 Emay (b. 1991, Mubarik Gyenne-Bayere), rapper
 Dylan Ennis (b. 1991), basketball player
 Tyler Ennis (b. 1994), chosen 18th overall in the 2014 NBA Draft

F

 Daniel Fabrizi (b. 1992), association football player defender
 James Robinson Fallis (1871-1935), MPP, Peel (1913-1916), livestock dealer
 Jordan Faria (b. 2000), soccer player
 David Feiss (b. 1959), creator of Cow and Chicken and I Am Weasel, raised in town
 Chris Felix (b. 1964), NHL hockey player
 Susan Fennell, former Mayor of Brampton
 Paul Ferreira (b. 1973), former NDP MPP
 James Fleming (1839-1902), MP, Peel (1882-1887), lawyer and teacher
 Mike Forbes (b. 1957), NHL hockey player
 Sgt Lorne Ford (1969-2002), wounded in the Tarnak Farm incident of the War in Afghanistan
 Steve Fox, singer/songwriter
 Tenyka Francique (b. 1991), footballer, Guyana women's national team
 Raz Fresco (b. 1995), rapper and record producer
 Doug Frith (1945–2009), former MP for Sudbury, former president of the Canadian Motion Picture Distributors Association
 David Frost, NHLPA sports agent, aka Jim McCauley

G

 Sir William James Gage (1849-1921), educator, entrepreneur and philanthropist
 Gabe Gala (b. 1989), MLS soccer
 Larisa Galadza (b. 1971), Ambassador of Canada to Ukraine
 Anthony Gale (b. 1993), sledge hockey player, 2014 Olympic bronze medalist
 Jonita Gandhi (b. 1989), Bollywood singer
 William H. Gardiner (1861-1935), photographer
 Steve Gatzos (b. 1961), NHL hockey player
 Sudarshan Gautam (b. 1978), first person to summit Mount Everest, without arms or prosthetics
 Omar Gandhi, architect known for rural vernacular architecture
 Parm Gill (b. 1974), former MP for Brampton—Springdale
 Raminder Gill (born 1950 or 1951), former MPP for Bramalea—Gore—Malton—Springdale
 Grandy Glaze (b. 1992), NBLC basketball player
 Camila Gonzalez (b. 1997), model, television host and beauty pageant titleholder
 Bal Gosal (b. 1961), politician MP for Bramalea—Gore—Malton, Minister of State-Sport
 Mikyla Grant-Mentis (b. 1998), NWHL ice hockey player
 Tyler Graovac (b. 1993), AHL hockey player
 Gordon Graydon (1897-1953), MP for Peel, Conservative opposition leader, alternate UN delegate for Canada, lawyer
 Sabrina Grdevich (b. 1971), actor, Traders
 Dave Greszczyszyn (b. 1979), skeleton racer
 Raj Grewal (b. 1985), former MP for Brampton East

H

 John Haggert (1822-1887), first Mayor of Brampton, businessman
 Ijah Halley (b. 2001), soccer player
 Rachel Hannah (b. 1986), distance runner
 Shane Harte (b. 1996), actor, Lost & Found Music Studios
 Daniel Harper (b. 1989), track and field
 Mike Harris (b. 1967), curler
 David Hearn (b. 1979), golfer
 Charles Hefferon (1878-1932), Olympic marathon runner
 Doneil Henry (b. 1993, soccer
 Jill Hetherington (b. 1964), tennis player
 Tyson Heung (b. 1979), German Olympic speed skater
 Bettie Hewes (1924-2001), MLA, Edmonton-Gold Bar (1986-1997)
 W. W. Hiltz (1873–1936), Mayor of Toronto (1924-1925)
 Justin Hodgman (b. 1988), hockey player
 Junior Hoilett (b. 1990, David Hoilett), soccer player
 Nick Holder (b. 1969), underground house/hip-hop DJ, raised in Brampton
 Karla Homolka (b. 1970), murderer, briefly lived with her relatives in their Brampton condominium
 Sandy Hudson, political activist, writer, co-founder of Black Lives Matter movement in Canada
 Tamar Huggins (b. 1986), tech entrepreneur, author and educator
 Shaan Hundal (b. 1999), soccer player
 Patrick Husbands (b. 1973), horse racing
 Ashfaq Hussain (b. 1951), Urdu-language poet
 Atiba Hutchinson (b. 1983), Süper Lig soccer

J

 Ric Jackman (b. 1978), NHL ice hockey defenceman
 Samuel Jacob Jackson (1848-1942), Manitoba politician
 Billy Jamieson (1954–2011), treasure and antique dealer, reality television personality
 Mark Janoschak (b. 1968), figure skater
 Linda Jeffrey (b. c. 1958), former Mayor of Brampton, former MPP for Brampton-Springdale and cabinet minister
 Colin Jenkins (b. 1983), Olympic triathlete
 Karl Jennings (b. 1979), hurdler
 Hakeem Johnson (b. 1994), CFL football player
 Rae Johnson (b. 1998), basketball journalist
 Shaq Johnson (b. 1993), CFL football player
 Randy Johnston (b. 1958), NHL hockey player
 Robert Johnston (1856-1913), farmer and politician, MP for Cardwell

K

 Andrew Kania (b. 1987), former MP
 Alain Kashama (b. 1979), CFL, NFL, NCAA football player
 Fernand Kashama (b. 1985), CFL, NCAA football player
 Hakeem Kashama (b. 1978), CFL, NFL, NCAA football player
 Kalonji Kashama (b. 1991), CFL football player
 Rupi Kaur (b. 1992), poet
 Adam Keefe (b. 1984), hockey player
 Sheldon Keefe (b. 1980), hockey player
 William Parker Kennedy (1892-1968), labour leader, president of the Brotherhood of Railroad Trainmen, born in Huttonville
 Greg Kerr-Wilson, Bishop of Calgary, was the rector of the Church of the Holy Family, Brampton
 Kamal Khera, MP for Brampton West
 Grzegorz Kielsa (b. 1979), Polish Olympic boxer
 Chris Kowalczuk (b. 1985), CFL football player
 Kuldip Kular (b. 1948), former MPP

L

 Kyle Labine (b. 1983), actor, Grand Star
 Tyler Labine (b. 1978), actor, Animal Practice, Rise of the Planet of the Apes
 Tom Laidlaw (b. 1958), hockey player
 John Henderson Lamont (1865-1936), lawyer, politician, and judge
 Morgan Lander (b. 1982), lead singer for alternative metal group Kittie
 Tory Lanez (b. 1992 as Daystar Peterson), rapper, producer
 Trevor Large (b. 1980), ice hockey coach, former ice hockey player
 Cyle Larin (b. 1995), soccer, MLS and Canada national team
 Clayton Latham (b. 1980), long jumper
 A. J. Lawson (b. 2000), college basketball player
 Kailey Leila (b. 1996), footballer, Guyana women's national team
 Kris Lemche (b. 1978), Gemini Award winning actor, Emily of New Moon
 Exco Levi (b. Wayne Ford Levy), reggae musician
 Martin Lindsay (b. 1982), boxer
 George Locke (1870-1937), chief librarian of the Toronto Public Library
 Dr. Lawrence Loh, Region of Peel Medical Officer of Health, previously practiced family medicine in Brampton
 Sir James A. Lougheed (1854–1925), Alberta politician and businessman, born in Brampton, before serving 30 years in Senate,  including as Leader of the Opposition in the Senate
 Annabel Lyon (b. 1971), writer
 Nicole Lyn (b. 1978), Student Bodies, married to Dulé Hill
 Shannon Lynn (b. 1985), Canadian–born Scottish international football goalkeeper

M

 Shanyn MacEachern (b. 1980), Olympic gymnast
 Lex MacKenzie (1885-1970), veteran and MPP, York North (1945-1967), died at Brampton
 Harinder Malhi (born ), MPP for Brampton—Springdale
 Graeme McCarrel, curler
 John McDermid (b. 1940), various cabinet positions under Brian Mulroney
 Scott McGillivray (b. 1978), carpenter and television host
 Graham McGregor (b. 1993), Member of Provincial Parliament
 Judi McLeod (b. 1944), journalist
 Simon Mangos (b. 1980), ice hockey player
 Baj Maan (b. 2000), soccer player
 Jahkeele Marshall-Rutty (b. 2004), soccer player
 Davie Mason (b. 1984), former football player
 Rob Maver (b. 1986), retired CFL football player
 William Armstrong McCulla (1837-1923), industrialist, building contractor and political figure
 Michael Meeks (b. 1972), international basketball player
 Richie Mehta, film director, Genie nominee
 John Meredith (1933-2000), abstract expressionist painter
 Jerome Messam (b. 1985), CFL football player
 John Metchie III (b. 2000), NFL football player
 Wayne Middaugh (b. 1967), curler
 Erin Mielzynski (b. 1990), World Cup slalom race winner
 Haviah Mighty (b. 1992), rapper
 Liam Millar (b. 1999), U18 Premier League soccer player
 Ken Millin (b. 1975), lacrosse player
 Alex Milne, comic book artist
 Massimo Mirabelli (b. 1991), NASL footballer
 Rohinton Mistry (b. 1952), author
 Sonja Molnar (b. 1990), former professional tennis player
 Christopher Moloney (b. 1977), writer and photographer, known for FILMography rephotography
 Sean Monahan (b. 1994), hockey player
 Jim Moss (b. 1977), lacrosse player
 Alyscha Mottershead (b. 1991), former Canadian national soccer player
 Sophia Mustafa (1922-2005), writer, politician, the first non-white female member of a legislature in Africa

Members of the band Moneen are also from Brampton.

N

 Rick Nash (b. 1984), hockey player
 Zarqa Nawaz (b. 1968), writer, journalist, filmmaker, creator of Little Mosque on the Prairie
 Jayden Nelson (b. 2002), professional soccer player forward
 Kris Newbury (b. 1982), hockey player
 Jabs Newby (b. 1991), basketball player, NBLC
 Alfred Westland Nixon (1863-1921), MPP, Halton (1905-1919), educated at Brampton and in Toronto
 Tobias C. Norris (1861-1936), former Manitoba premier
 Jeffrey Northrup (1966–2021), Toronto police officer killed in line of duty
 NorthSideBenji (b. Jaiden Anthony Watson), rapper
 Jason Nugent (b. 1982), former CFL football player
 Marcos Nunes (b. 1992), soccer player

O

 Brenna O'Brien (b. 1991), voice actor
 Christabel Oduro (b. 1992), soccer player, Canada women's national soccer team
 Frank Oliver (1853–1933), politician and journalist, MLA, MP, Laurier's Minister of the Interior
 Joseph Onabolu (b. 1994), pop singer
 Godfrey Onyeka (b. 1994), CFL football player
 Kene Onyeka (b. 1996), CFL football player
 Nakas Onyeka (b. 1994), CFL football player
 Tara Oram (b. 1984), country music recording artist
 Chika Stacy Oriuwa, physician, spoken word artist
 Anthony Osorio (b. 1994), soccer player, born in Toronto and raised in Brampton
 Jonathan Osorio (b. 1998), soccer player

P

 Josh Palmer, NFL-signed football wide receiver
 Caroline Park, medical student, Korean Olympic hockey player, former child actress
 Tracy Parsons, second leader of the Progressive Canadian Party
 Slava Pastuk, operated a drug dispensary in Montreal, and put on house arrest in Brampton
 Howard Pawley OC (1934-2015), former Manitoba premier
 Stephanie Pearl-McPhee (b. 1968), author and knitter,
 Derek Perera (b. 1977), former Canada national cricket team player
 Kayla Perrin (b. c. 1970), author
 Russell Peters (b. 1970), stand-up comedian who was raised in town, and later moved back.
 Kyle Pettey, Paralympic shot putter
 Reshon Phillip (b. 1998), soccer player
 David Phillips (b. 1978), actor, Shark City, Eat Wheaties!
 John Pomorski (1905-1977), MLB baseball pitcher, died in Brampton
 Allison Pottinger (b. 1973), curler
 Gerry Powers, ice hockey goalie
 Gaylord Powless (1946–2001), lacrosse player
 Martin Prashad (1959-2000), Guyanese-Canadian cricketer for Canada (1983–1996)
 Norman Mills Price (1877-1951), illustrator

Q
 Len Quesnelle (b. 1966), ice hockey coach, former player

R

 Navid Rahman (b. 1996), Pakistani Canadian footballer
 Jasvir Rakkar (b. 1991), Chicago Cubs pitcher, Canada national team gold medalist
 Leah-Marie Ramalho (b. 1992), footballer, Guyana women's national team
 Brittany Raymond (b. 1995), actor, The Next Step
 Adonijah Reid (b. 1999), soccer player
 Alyssa Reid (b. 1983), singer, 2012 Juno Award nominee
 Jack Reid (1924-2009), watercolourist
 Johnny Reid (b. 1974), singer
 Sam Reid (b. 1963), keyboardist, Glass Tiger
 Kyle Reyes (b. 1993), Olympic judoka, born in Brampton and raised in Toronto
 Jessie Reyez (b. 1990), singer-songwriter 
 Donn Reynolds (1921-1997), country music singer, Canada's "King of the Yodelers"
 Simon Reynolds (b. 1963), actor
 Rob Ricci (b. 1984), international hockey player
 Friendly Rich, avant-garde composer/musician
 Tyrell Richards (b. 1998), CFL football player
 Jael Richardson, author, broadcaster, literary convention organizer
 Quillan Roberts (b. 1994), soccer player on loan to Toronto FC
 George R. Robertson (b. 1933), Gemini Award-winning actor, Police Academy
 Peter Robertson, former Mayor of Brampton
 Greg Roe (b. 1990), trampolinist
 Paul Roe (b. 1959), soccer player
 Peter Roe (b. 1955), ASL, MISL soccer
 William Francis Romain (1818 – after 1869), first postmaster of Brampton, 2nd mayor of Oakville
 William Ronald (1926–1998), abstract artist
 Troy Ross (b. 1975), boxer
 Kyle Rubisch (b. 1988), NLL/MLL lacrosse player

S

 Ruby Sahota, MP for Brampton North
 Anne Samplonius, retired road cyclist
 Daniel Sandate, United States Army deserter, second known U.S. soldier to be deported from Canada
 Maninder Sidhu, MP for Brampton East
 Ramesh Sangha (b. 1945), MP for Brampton Centre
 David Lynch Scott (1845–1924), Regina mayor
 Kyle Seeback (b. 1970), politician
 Tyler Seguin (b. 1992), hockey player
 Joseph Shabason, multi-instrumentalist and composer
 Gordon Shadrach, artist and educator
 Jeff Shattler (b. 1984), lacrosse player
 Tiffany Shaw, geophysical scientist
 Bob Sicinski (b. 1946), former WHA ice hockey player
 Maninder Sidhu (b. 1984), MP for Brampton East
 Sonia Sidhu, MP for Brampton South
 Christine E. Silverberg (b. 1949, née Bertram), lawyer, first female Chief of the Calgary Police Service (1995-2000)
 Jagmeet Singh (b. 1979), politician, MPP for Bramalea—Gore—Malton 2011–2017, federal leader of the New Democratic Party 2017–
 Jarryn Skeete (b. 1993), NBLC basketball player
 Gavin Smellie (b. 1986), track and field
 Blair Smith (b. 1990), CFL linebacker
 Cecil Smith (1936-2016), track and field coach, publisher
 Robbie Smith (b. 1997), Canadian football defensive lineman
 Daniel Sparre (b. 1984), international hockey player
 Paul Stalteri (b. 1977), soccer
 Steve Stanton (b. 1956), science fiction author
 Courtney Stephen (b. 1989), former CFL player
 Jay Stephens (b. 1971), cartoonist, creator of Tutenstein and The Secret Saturdays
 John Smith Stewart (1878-1970), Alberta MLA, brigadier-general, dentist
 Rob Stewart (b. 1961), actor, Tropical Heat
 Kevin Stittle (b. 1979), Olympic sailing
 Justin Stoddart (b. 1995), soccer player
 Jamie Storr (b. 1975), hockey player
 Peter Sturgeon (b. 1954), former NHL hockey player

T

 Alisha Tatham (b. 1986), basketball player
 Patrick Tatham, basketball coach and former basketball player
 Tamara Tatham (b. 1985), basketball player
 Robbie Taylor (b. 1981), swimmer
 Dan Teat (b. 1971), former Canadian lacrosse player
 Nancy Telfer (b. 1950), Canadian choral conductor, music educator and composer
 Chris Terry (b. 1989), NHL hockey player
 Alan Thicke (1947-2016), actor, briefly lived in Brampton
 Jesse Thistle, Canadian Métis-Cree PhD student working on theories of intergenerational and historic trauma of the Métis people
 Dave Thomas (b. 1976), basketball player
 John Thomas (b. 1960), Olympic dance mixed figure skater
 Kadell Thomas (b. 1996), soccer
 Roger Thompson (b. 1991), soccer player, Brampton-raised
 Scott Thompson (b. 1959), one of the first openly gay television personalities in Canada, was part of The Kids in the Hall comedy troupe.
 Tristan Thompson (b. 1991), basketball player
 Robert Tiller (b. 1949), Thoroughbred horse trainer and owner, Canadian Horse Racing Hall of Fame
 Tobi (b. Oluwatobi Ajibolade), rapper and singer
 Töme (b. 1997, Michelle Oluwatomi Akanbi), singer, songwriter, actor
 Raffi Torres (b. 1981), hockey player
 Sunny Tripathy (b. 1989), actor, comedian, writer
 The Honorable Justice Michael H. Tulloch, Ontario Superior Court
Steven Turner (b. 1987), former CFL football player

V

 Edo Van Belkom (b. 1962), horror author
 Kate Van Buskirk (b. 1987), cross-country runner, Commonwealth Games medalist
 Daryl Veltman (b. 1985), NLL lacrosse player
 Jim Veltman (b. 1966), NLL lacrosse player
 Kevin Vuong (b. c. 1989), Member of Parliament for Spadina—Fort York, Royal Canadian Navy reserve public affairs officer

W

 Warren Ward (b. 1962), basketball player
 Mike Weaver (b. 1978), retired hockey player
 Scott Wedgewood (b. 1992), NHL goalie draftee
 Jabar Westerman (b. 1989), CFL draftee
 Jamaal Westerman (b. 1985), NFL football player
 Ken Whillans (1927-1990), mayor of Brampton
 Catherine White (b. 1990), hockey player
 Ian Williams, Giller Prize-winning author
 Shomari Williams (b. 1985), CFL football player
 Sir Robert S. C. Williams, founder of St. Leonard's Place
 Curtis Williamson (1867-1944), artist known as "The Canadian Rembrandt"
 Emma-Jayne Wilson (b. 1981), horse racing
 JoAnn Wilson (1939-1983), ex-wife and later murder victim of MLA Colin Thatcher
 Mike Wilson (b. 1975), hockey player
 Murphy Wiredu (b. 1985), soccer
 WondaGurl, musician
 Roy Wood$ (b. 1996, Denzel Spencer), rapper and R&B musician
 Supinder Wraich (b. 1993), actress and television creator
 Lowell Wright (b. 2003), soccer player

Y

 James Yurichuk (b. 1986), CFL football player

Z

 Tomislav Zanoški (b. 1984), hockey player
 Edmund Zavitz (1875-1968), "the father of reforestation in Ontario."

Canadian honours system recipients
William G. Davis and Michael F. Clarke have both received the Order of Canada. Davis is the only Bramptonian to receive an Order of Ontario. There are 1253 Brampton residents to receive Exemplary Service Medals. The Golden Jubilee Award was given to 168 in 2002.

 Caring Canadian Award: Adriana J. Pouw 
 Decorations for Bravery: Glenn Bannerman-Maxwell, Robert Reginald Fraser, Maribel Garcia, Susan Elizabeth McHale, Mandeep Singh Dhillon, Thomas Tierney, J. Robert Walsh, and David Ware.

 Constable David Henry Bowles, M.B., Medal of Bravery recipient
 David Alan Holwell, Medal of Bravery recipient
 Sergeant (Ret'd) Joseph Gabriel Simon Marion, M.S.M., Meritorious Service Medal (civil division) recipient

See also
List of people from Mississauga
List of people from Caledon

References

Brampton

Brampton
Culture of Brampton
Sport in Brampton